Union Sportive du Foyer de la Régie Abidjan-Niger (US FRAN) is a Burkinabé football club based in Bobo Dioulasso. They play their home games at the Stade Wobi Bobo-Dioulasso.

The club plays in orange, white and red. It was founded in 1959, renamed USCB in 1989 and returned to the original name in 1998.

Performance in CAF competitions
 African Cup of Champions Clubs: 1 appearance
1969: First Round

Association football clubs established in 1959
Football clubs in Burkina Faso
1959 establishments in Upper Volta